is the fourth studio album by Japanese idol duo Wink, released by Polystar on July 11, 1990. It features the No. 1 single "Sexy Music", a Japanese-language cover of The Nolans' 1981 single. Also included in the album are covers of Carmin's "Dos Hombres", the Nolans' "I'm in the Mood for Dancing", Kool & the Gang's "Cherish", and Eddie Hodges' "I'm Gonna Knock on Your Door". Velvet was Wink's first album to feature Satoshi Kadokura as the duo's music arranger.

The album peaked at No. 4 on Oricon's albums chart and sold over 198,000 copies. It was also certified Gold by the RIAJ.

Track listing 
All lyrics are written by Neko Oikawa, except where indicated; all music is arranged by Satoshi Kadokura, except where indicated.

Charts

Certification

References

External links 
 
 
 

1990 albums
Wink (duo) albums
Japanese-language albums